Meintangk may be,

Meintangk people
Meintangk language